Fernando David Ramsey Ramsey (born December 20, 1965) is a former Panamanian center fielder who played in Major League Baseball. Listed at 6' 1" , 175 lb. , Ramsey batted and threw right handed. He was born in Rainbow City, a section of the city of Colón in Panama.

Early life
While growing up, Ramsey was also active and successful in track and field, winning medals for Panama at the Central American and Caribbean Junior Championships. Ramsey began running at eleven years old and earned a scholarship to run track at New Mexico State University. He had never played baseball competitively until the Aggies baseball coach convinced him to join the team.

Career
The Chicago Cubs selected Ramsey in the 33rd round of the 1987 MLB Draft out of New Mexico State, and assigned him immediately to Class A Geneva Cubs. Following five promotions, he joined briefly the Cubs during its 1992 season. He hit a batting average of .120 (3-for-20) in 18 games, but did not score or drove in a run.

Ramsey later played in the New York Mets and Chicago White Sox minor league systems, and also saw action in the Mexican Summer League and the Venezuelan Winter League.

Personal life
Ramsey and his wife, Sylvia, had their first child, a son named Nicholas, in November 1994. As of 1995, they were living in Brookfield, Connecticut. Ramsey earned a degree in business administration from New Mexico State.

Sources

External links

1965 births
Living people
Acereros de Monclova players
Bangor Blue Ox players
Broncos de Reynosa players
Charleston Wheelers players
Charlotte Knights players
Chicago Cubs players
Geneva Cubs players
Indianapolis Indians players
Indios de Mayagüez players
Panamanian expatriate baseball players in Puerto Rico
Iowa Cubs players
Major League Baseball outfielders
Major League Baseball players from Panama
Nashville Sounds players
New Mexico State Aggies baseball players
New Mexico State University alumni
Norfolk Tides players
Panamanian expatriate baseball players in Mexico
Panamanian expatriate baseball players in the United States
Sportspeople from Colón, Panama
Peoria Chiefs players
Petroleros de Cabimas players
Tiburones de La Guaira players
Panamanian expatriate baseball players in Venezuela
Winston-Salem Spirits players
College men's track and field athletes in the United States
Panamanian male sprinters